The notion of a sovereign state arises in the 16th century with the development of modern diplomacy.
For earlier times, the term "sovereign state" is an anachronism. What corresponded to sovereign states in the medieval and ancient period were monarchs ruling By the Grace of God, de facto feudal or imperial autocrats, or de facto independent nations or tribal confederations.

Sovereign states

A
 Aach - Lordship of Aach
 - Free Imperial City of Aachen
 Aalen - Free Imperial City of Aalen
 Aceh - Sultanate of Aceh 
 Adal - Adal Sultanate
 - Kingdom of Alodia
 - Duchy of Alsace
 Andorra - Principality of Andorra
 Anhalt - Principality of Anhalt
Annam - Kingdom of Annam
 Ansbach - Margraviate of Ansbach
 Aq Qoyunlu (White Sheep Turkomans)
 Aragon - Kingdom of Aragon
Arakan - Kingdom of Arakan
 Armagnac - County of Armagnac
 - Kingdom of Ashanti
Assam - Kingdom of Assam
 Astrakhan - Khanate of Astrakhan
 Austria - Archduchy of Austria
 Auvergne - County of Auvergne
 Ayutthaya - Ayutthaya Kingdom
Aztecs - Aztec Empire

B
 Baden - Margraviate of Baden
Bali - Sultanate of Bali
 Bavaria - Duchy of Bavaria
Bengal - Sultanate of Bengal
 - Benin Empire
 Bohemia - Kingdom of Bohemia
 Bourbonnais - Duchy of Bourbonnais
 Brandenburg - March/Margraviate of Brandenburg
 Bremen - Prince-Archbishopric of Bremen
 Brittany - Duchy of Brittany
 - Sultanate of Brunei
 Brunswick-Lüneburg - Duchy of Brunswick-Lüneburg

C
 Castille - Crown of Castille
 Catalonia - Principality of Catalonia 
 Ceylon - Kotte Kingdom
Chagatai Khanate - Chagatai Khanate
Champa - Kingdom of Champa
Cherokee - Cherokee Tribe
China - Empire of the Great Ming
 Cleves - Duchy of Cleves
 Cologne - Electorate of Cologne
 Connacht - Kingdom of Connacht
 Cospaia - Republic of Cospaia
Creek - Creek Tribe
 Crimea - Crimean Khanate

D
Đại Việt - Kingdom of Đại Việt
Deccan - Kingdom of Deccan
Dehli - Sultanate of Dehli
 - Kingdom of Denmark

E
 - Kingdom of England
 - Ethiopian Empire

F
 - Kingdom of France
 Friesland - Lordship of Friesland
Funj - Funj Tribe

G
 Gelre - Duchy of Gelre
 Georgia - Kingdom of Georgia
 - The Most Serene Republic of Genoa
 Golden Horde - Golden Horde Khanate
Gondwana - Kingdom of Gondwana
Gujarat - Sultanate of Gujarat

H
Haasa - The Sheikdom of al-Haasa
 - Free and Hanseatic City of Hamburg
Hausa - Hausa Kingdoms
 Hejaz - Sultanate of Hejaz
 Hesse - Landgraviate of Hesse
 Hungary - Kingdom of Hungary
Huron - Huron Tribe

I
Inca - Inca Empire
Iroquois - Iroquois Tribe

J
Japan - Sengoku period of Japan

K
Kanem Bornu - Bornu Empire
  - Kingdom of Kartli
Kashmir - Sultanate of Kashmir
 - Kazakh Khanate
 Kazan - Kazan Khanate
Khandesh - Kingdom of Khandesh
Khmer - Khmer Empire
 Knights Hospitaller - Sovereign Order of Saint John of Jerusalem of Rhodes and of Malta, Knights of Malta, Knights of Rhodes, and Chevaliers of Malta
 Kongo - Kingdom of Kongo
 Korea - Kingdom of Joseon

L
Lan Na - Kingdom of Lan Na
Lan Xang - Kingdom of Lan Xang
 Leinster - Kingdom of Leinster
 Liège - Prince-Bishopric of Liège
 Lithuania - Grand Duchy of Lithuania
 Lorraine - Duchy of Lorraine

M
 Mainz - Archbishopric of Mainz
Makassar - Sultanate of Makassar
Malacca - Sultanate of Malacca
 Maldives - Sultanate of Maldives
Mali - Mali Empire
Malwa - Malwa Sultanate
 Mamluk - Mamluk Sultanate
Manchu - Manchu People
Manipur - Kingdom of Manipur
 Mantua - Duchy of Mantua
Maya - Maya Empire
 Mazovia - Duchy of Mazovia
 Mecklenburg - Duchy of Mecklenburg
 Milan - Duchy of Milan
 Modena - Duchy of Modena and Reggio
 - Principality of Moldavia
 Monaco - Principality of Monaco
Mongol Khanate - Khanate of Mongol
 - Sultanate of Morocco
 Moscow - Grand Duchy of Moscow
Mrauk U - Kingdom of Mrauk U
 Munster - Kingdom of Munster
 Münster - Prince-Bishopric of Münster
Mutapa - Kingdom of Mutapa
 Mysore - Kingdom of Mysore

N
 Najd - Sultanate of Najd
  Naples - Kingdom of Naples
 Navarra - Kingdom of Navarra
 Naxos - Duchy of the Naxos
Nepal - Kingdom of Nepal
Nogai - Nogai Horde
 Norway - Kingdom of Norway

O
Oirats - Oirat Horde
 Oldenburg - County of Oldenburg
 Oman - Sultanate of Oman
Orissa - Kingdom of Orissa
 Orléans - Duchy of Orléans
 - Sublime Ottoman State
Oyo - Oyo Empire

P
 Electorate of the Palatinate - Palatinate of the Rhine
 - States of the Church
Pegu - Kingdom of Pegu
Pisa - Republic of Pisa
 Poland - Kingdom of Poland
 Pomerania - Duchy of Pomerania
 Portugal - Kingdom of Portugal
 Pskov - Pskov Republic

Q
Qasim - Qasim Khanate

R
 Ragusa - Republic of Ragusa
Rājputāna - Kingdom of Rājputāna
 Riga - Archbishopric of Riga
 Ryukyu - Kingdom of Ryukyu

S
Saaremaa - Bishopric of Saaremaa-Wiek
 Salzburg - Archbishopric of Salzburg
 - Most Serene Republic of San Marino
 County of Santa Fiora
 - Duchy of Savoy
 - Kingdom of Scotland
Shan - Kingdom of Shan
Shawnee - Shawnee Tribe
Sibir - Khanate of Sibir
 Sicily - Kingdom of Sicily
 Siena - Republic of Siena
 Silesia - Duchy of Silesia
Sindh - Kingdom of Sindh
Songhai - Songhai Empire
 - Kingdom of Sukhothai
 Sulu - Sultanate of Sulu
Swahili - Swahili Tribe
 Sweden - Kingdom of Sweden
 Switzerland - Swiss Confederacy

T
Tartu - Bishopric of Tartu
Taungu - Kingdom of Taungu
 Teutonic Knights - Teutonic Order
 Thuringia - Duchy of Thuringia
Tibet - Tibetan Empire
 Timurid - Timurid Empire
 Transylvania - Principality of Transylvania
 Travancore - Kingdom of Travancore
 Trier - Archbishopric of Trier
Tripoli - Sultanate of Tripoli
 Tunisia - Kingdom of Tunisia
Tuscany - Republic of Tuscany
 Tír Eoghain - Kingdom of Tyrone

U
 Urbino - Archdiocese of Urbino
 Utrecht - Bishopric of Utrecht

V
 - Most Serene Republic of Venice
Vijayanagara - Vijayanagara Empire

W
 - Principality of Wallachia
 Württemberg - Duchy of Württemberg
 Würzburg - Bishopric of Würzburg

Y
 Yemen - Kingdom of Yemen

Z
Zapotec - Zapotec Empire
  Zeta - Principality of Zeta

Sov